Hombre is a 1967 American Revisionist Western film directed by Martin Ritt, based on the 1961 novel of the same name by Elmore Leonard and starring  Paul Newman, Fredric March, Richard Boone and Diane Cilento.

Newman's amount of dialogue in the film is minimal and much of the role is conveyed through mannerism and action. This was the sixth and final time Ritt directed Newman; they had previously worked together on The Long Hot Summer, Paris Blues, Hemingway's Adventures of a Young Man, Hud, and The Outrage.

Plot

In late 19th-century Arizona an Apache-raised white man, John Russell, faces prejudice in the white world after he returns for his inheritance (a gold watch and a boarding house) on his father's death.  Deciding to sell the house to buy a herd of horses, which does not endear him to the boarders who live there or to the caretaker, Jessie, Russell ends up riding a stagecoach with Jessie and unhappily married boarders Doris and Billy Lee Blake leaving town.

Three others ride with them: Indian agent Professor Alexander Favor, his aristocratic wife Audra, and the crude Cicero Grimes.  On discovering that John Russell is of Apache background, Professor Favor requests that Russell ride up top with driver Henry Mendez. The stagecoach is robbed by a gang led by Grimes, who knew that Dr Favor had been carrying money that he stole from the very Apaches with whom Russell grew up.  Grimes rides off, taking Mrs Favor as a hostage. Russell pulls out his hidden Winchester rifle and shoots two of the outlaws—one of whom is Jessie's former lover, sheriff-gone-bad Frank—who have the stolen money in their saddle bags. He insists that Dr Favor give the recovered money to him. His fellow passengers now appeal to Russell to lead them to safety. After Russell scouts ahead, Dr Favor disarms Mendez.  Russell returns as Favor is about to leave with the money and supplies; Russell banishes him from the group.

Russell's instincts to protect the group clash with their morality and desire to save the Favors, especially when Grimes and his remaining gang offer to trade Mrs Favor for the money. Their pity for her life eventually outweighs the knowledge that Grimes is using her to bait a trap, and Jessie talks Russell into saving Mrs Favor. He gives the money to Billy Lee and asks him to take it back to the Indians from whom it was stolen.  Russell descends from the group's hideout with saddle bags that he pretends are full of the money, while Billy Lee stays in the hideout and aims a rifle at the Mexican outlaw who is at Russell's back. Russell cuts Mrs Favor loose, and she slowly and painfully makes her way up to the group, but by the time Russell throws the saddle bags to Grimes she has collapsed at a point where she is obscuring Billy Lee's target. In the ensuing firefight, although Russell is able to kill Grimes, he dies in a gunfire exchange with the Mexican outlaw, who is mortally wounded. As his last words, the Mexican outlaw says, "I would like at least to know his name". Mendez replies, "He was called John Russell".

Cast
 Paul Newman as John Russell 
 Fredric March as Reverend Alex Favor
 Richard Boone as Cicero Grimes
 Diane Cilento as Jessie Brown
 Cameron Mitchell as Frank Braden
 Barbara Rush as Audra Favor
 Peter Lazer as Billy Lee Blake
 Margaret Blye as Doris Blake
 Martin Balsam as Henry Mendez
 Skip Ward as Steve Early
 Frank Silvera as Mexican Bandit
 David Canary as Lamar Dean
 Val Avery as Delgado
 Larry Ward as Soldier

Background
Hombre is one of several films in the 1960s portraying the situation of the Native Americans in a different way from how they had previously been seen in Westerns. Management of  Indians who did their share of pioneer killing (witting or unwitting), and their perception of exploitation, are somewhat depicted.

Production
The movie was filmed on location in the Coronado National Forest in Arizona, at the Helvetia Mine in Pima County, Arizona, at Old Tucson, Arizona, and at the Bell Ranch in Santa Susana, California. Stage station scenes were filmed at Jean Dry Lake, Las Vegas, Nevada.

Reception

Box office
The film earned $6.5 million in rentals in North America, making it one of the biggest hits of the year.

According to Fox records, the film needed to earn $9,600,000 in rentals to break even and made $9,910,000, meaning it made a profit.

Critical reaction
Most reviews of the film are positive.  Critics praise the performance of Newman and the writing of Elmore Leonard.  Film critic Roger Ebert, in a 1967 review, notes, "The performances are uniformly excellent. Three particularly pleasing ones, however, were from Diane Cilento, the boarding-house operator who talks Hombre into his ethical heroics; Richard Boone as the villainous Cicero Grimes, and Martin Balsam, as the good Mexican. Ritt directs with a steady hand, and the dialog by Irving Ravetch and Harriet Frank bears listening to. It's intelligent, and has a certain grace, as well. Last year, Richard Brooks' The Professionals was the best-directed film out of Hollywood, and this year it looks as if the honors may rest with Martin Ritt and Hombre." Ebert gave the film a rating of three and a half out of four possible stars in his review.

Hombre holds a 93% approval rating on the film review aggregator Rotten Tomatoes, based on 14 reviews with an average rating of 8.1/10.

See also

List of American films of 1967

References

External links
 
 
 

1967 films
1967 Western (genre) films
American Western (genre) films
1960s English-language films
Films directed by Martin Ritt
20th Century Fox films
Films based on American novels
Films based on Western (genre) novels
Films based on works by Elmore Leonard
Films scored by David Rose
Films set in the 19th century
Films set in Arizona
Films shot in Arizona
Revisionist Western (genre) films
1960s American films